Sprague is an unincorporated community located in the town of Necedah, Juneau County, Wisconsin, United States. The community is likely named for John and Gleason Sprague, the owners and publishers of the Mauston Star newspaper in the late 19th century. The post office was established in February 1907 with Michael Anthony as postmaster.

References

Unincorporated communities in Juneau County, Wisconsin
Unincorporated communities in Wisconsin